In differential geometry, a discipline within mathematics, a distribution on a manifold  is an assignment  of vector subspaces satisfying certain properties. In the most common situations, a distribution is asked to be a vector subbundle of the tangent bundle .

Distributions satisfying a further integrability condition give rise to foliations, i.e. partitions of the manifold into smaller submanifolds. These notions have several applications in many fields of mathematics, e.g. integrable systems, Poisson geometry, non-commutative geometry, sub-Riemannian geometry, differential topology, etc.

Even though they share the same name, distributions presented in this article have nothing to do with distributions in the sense of analysis.

Definition
Let  be a smooth manifold; a (smooth) distribution  assigns to any point  a vector subspace  in a smooth way. More precisely,  consists in a collection  of vector subspaces with the following property. Around any  there exist a neighbourhood  and a collection of vector fields  such that, for any point , span

Note that the number  may be different for different neighbourhoods. The notation  is used to denote both the assignment  and the subset .

Regular distributions 
Locally, this amounts to ask that every local basis is given by  linearly independent vector fields.

More compactly, a regular distribution is a vector subbundle  of rank  (this is actually the most commonly used definition). A rank  distribution is sometimes called an -plane distribution, and when , one talks about hyperplane distributions.

Special classes of distributions
Unless stated otherwise, by "distribution" we mean a smooth regular distribution (in the sense explained above).

Involutive distributions

Involutive distributions are a fundamental ingredient in the study of integrable systems.

Integrable distributions and foliations 
An integral manifold for a rank  distribution  is a submanifold  of dimension  such that  for every . A distribution is called integrable if through any point  there is an integral manifold. This means that  is the disjoint union of maximal connected integral manifolds, also called leaves;  defines therefore a foliation.

Locally, integrability means that for every point  there exists a local chart  such that, for every , the space  is spanned by the coordinate vectors . In other words, every point admits a foliation chart, i.e. the distribution  is tangent to the leaves of a foliation.

It is easy to see that any integrable distribution is automatically involutive. The converse is less trivial but holds by Frobenius theorem.

Weakly regular distributions 
Given any distribution , consider its associated Lie flag (note that some authors use a negative decreasing grading instead)

Then  is called weakly regular (or just regular by some authors) if there exists a sequence  of nested vector subbundles such that  (hence ).

Any weakly regular distribution has an associated graded vector bundleMoreover, the Lie bracket of vector fields descends, for any , to a -linear bundle morphism , called the -curvature. In particular, the -curvature vanishes identically if and only if the distribution is involutive.

The bundle , however, is in general not locally trivial, since the Lie algebras  are not isomorphic when varying the point . If this happens, the weakly regular distribution  is also called regular (or strongly regular by some authors). Note that the names (strongly, weakly) regular used here are completely unrelated with the notion of regularity discussed above (which is always assumed), i.e. the dimension of the spaces  being constant.

Bracket-generating distributions 

Clearly, the associated Lie flag of a bracket-generating distribution stabilises at the point . Even though being weakly regular and being bracket-generating are two independent properties (see the examples below), when a distribution satisfies both of them, the integer  from the two definitions is of course the same.

Thanks to Chow-Rashevskii theorem, given a bracket-generating distribution  on a connected manifold, any two points in  can be joined by a path tangent to the distribution.

Examples of regular distributions

Integrable ones 

Any vector field  on  defines a rank 1 distribution, by setting , which is automatically integrable: the image of any integral curve  is an integral manifold.
It is automatically integrable, and the integral manifolds are defined by the equations , for any constants .

Non-integrable ones 
It is bracket-generating since , but it is not weakly regular:  has rank 3 everywhere except on the surface .
One can also define an abstract contact structures on a manifold  as a hyperplane distribution which is maximally non-integrable, i.e. it is as far from being involutive as possible. An analogue of the Darboux theorem shows that such structure has the unique local model described above.
It is weakly regular, with grow vector , and bracket-generating. One can also define an abstract Engel structure on a manifold  as a weakly regular rank 2 distribution  such that  has rank 3 and has rank 4; Engel proved that such structure has the unique local model described above. 
In general, a Goursat structure on a manifold  is a rank 2 distribution which is weakly regular and bracket-generating, with grow vector . For  and  one recovers, respectively, contact distributions on 3-dimensional manifolds and Engel distributions. Goursat structures are locally diffeomorphic to the Cartan distribution of the jet bundles .

Singular distributions

A singular distribution, generalised distribution, or Stefan-Sussmann distribution, is a smooth distribution which is not regular. This means that the subspaces  may have different dimensions, and therefore the subset  is no longer a smooth subbundle.

Integrability and singular foliations 
The definitions of integral manifolds and of integrability given above applies also to the singular case (removing the requirement of the fixed dimension). However, Frobenius theorem does not hold in this context, and involutivity is in general not sufficient for integrability (counterexamples in low dimensions exist).

After several partial results, the integrability problem for singular distributions was fully solved by a theorem independently proved by Stefan and Sussmann. It states that a singular distribution  is integrable if and only if the following two properties hold:

  is generated by a family  of vector fields;
  is invariant with respect to every , i.e.

Similarly to the regular case, an integrable singular distribution defines a singular foliation, which intuitively consists in a partition of  into submanifolds (the maximal integral manifolds of ) of different dimensions.

The definition of singular foliation can be made precise in several equivalent ways. Actually, in the literature there is a plethora of variations, reformulations and generalisations of the Stefan-Sussman theorem, using different notion of singuar foliations according to which applications one has in mind, e.g. Poisson geometry or non-commutative geometry.

Examples 

 Given a Lie group action of a Lie group on a manifold , its infinitesimal generators span a singular distribution which is always integrable; the leaves of the associated singular foliation are precisely the orbits of the group action. The distribution/foliation is regular if and only if the action is free.
The distribution/foliation is regular If and only if the Poisson manifold is regular.
 More generally, the image of the anchor map  of any Lie algebroid  defines a singular distribution which is automatically integrable, and the leaves of the associated singular foliation are precisely the leaves of the Lie algebroid. The distribution/foliation is regular if and only if  has constant rank, i.e. the Lie algebroid is regular. Considering, respectively, the action Lie algebroid  and the cotangent Lie algebroid , one recovers the two examples above. 
 In dynamical systems, a singular distribution arise from the set of vector fields that commute with a given one.
 There are also examples and applications in control theory, where the generalised distribution represents infinitesimal constraints of the system.

References

Books, lecture notes and external links 
 William M. Boothby. Section IV. 8 in An Introduction to Differentiable Manifolds and Riemannian Geometry, Academic Press, San Diego, California, 2003.
John M. Lee, Chapter 19 in Introduction to Smooth Manifolds, Graduate Texts in Mathematics, Springer-Verlag, 2003.
Richard Montgomery, Chapters 2, 4 and 6 in A tour of subriemannian geometries, their geodesics and applications. Mathematical Surveys and Monographs 91. Amer. Math. Soc., Providence, RI, 2002.
Álvaro del Pino, Topological aspects in the study of tangent distributions. Textos de Matemática. Série B, 48. Universidade de Coimbra, 2019.
 

Differential geometry
Foliations